The golden-breasted fruiteater (Pipreola aureopectus) is a species of bird in the family Cotingidae. It is found in Colombia, and Venezuela, where its natural habitat is subtropical or tropical moist montane forests.  Considering range and population size, this species is not considered vulnerable

Description
The male has dark areas on the chin and lores, but otherwise the upper parts are green. The tertial wing feathers have pale tips. The throat and upper chest are bright yellow and the belly is lemon yellow with green streaks on the flanks. The female is bright green above, with pale tertials, and yellow, heavily streaked with green below. The eyes are yellow, the beak orange and the legs greyish-green. The voice is a high-pitched, multi-syllable phrase that first rises and then falls and lasts for up to three seconds.

Distribution and habitat
This species is found in mountainous regions of northeastern Colombia and northern Venezuela on the east side of the Andes. A separate population is known from the west slope of the mountain range in western Colombia.

Ecology
The golden-breasted fruiteater feeds only on fruit as far as is known. It is sometimes seen in small groups of mixed species but otherwise moves around singly or in pairs. Little is known of its breeding habits, but birds in breeding condition have been seen between January and June and also in September.

Status
Although the range of the golden-breasted fruiteater is not very great, it is a fairly common species and the population seems stable. For these reasons, the International Union for Conservation of Nature has assessed the bird as being a "least-concern species".

References

golden-breasted fruiteater
Birds of the Colombian Andes
Birds of the Venezuelan Andes
golden-breasted fruiteater
Taxonomy articles created by Polbot